Bridgepoint Group plc is a British private investment company listed on the London Stock Exchange and is a constituent of the FTSE 250 Index.

History
Bridgepoint was founded as NatWest Equity Partners, a private equity firm part of NatWest. The firm was renamed Bridgepoint Capital in May 2000 following a management buyout.

In May 2001, Bridgepoint closed its first fund following its independence from NatWest. The fund closed at €2 billion, and made its first investments in WT Foods, Virgin Active and Hydrex.

The firm closed its Europe II fund in 2001 and its Europe III fund in 2005. Bridgepoint closed its Europe IV fund in 2008 for €4.8 billion.

In 2011, the firm was renamed Bridgepoint Advisers. In March 2015, Bridgepoint closed its latest €4 billion Bridgepoint Europe V fund, bringing to €20.5 billion the amount of committed capital raised to date.

In August 2018, Dyal Capital Partners acquired a minority stake in Bridgepoint.

In 2021 Bridgepoint closed its £1.56 billion Bridgepoint Development Capital IV fund. In July 2021, Bridgepoint Group was listed to the London Stock Exchange.

Notable investments

 AHT Cooling Systems
 ASK Italian
 Burger King
 CAST
 Care UK
 Deliveroo
 Dennis Eagle purchased August 1999sold January 2004 to ABN Amro
 Diaverum
 ERM
 Fat Face
 Hobbycraft
 Humanetics
 Infinitas Learning
 Infront Sports & Media
 Leeds Bradford Airport (now owned by AMP Capital)
 Molton Brown
 Moneycorp
 Nordic Cinema Group
 Pret a Manger
 Rodenstock
 Safestore
 Trustly
 Virgin Active
 Wiggle
 Zizzi

See also
 List of companies based in London

References

External links
Official website

Financial services companies based in London
Financial services companies established in 2000
NatWest Group
Private equity firms of the United Kingdom
2000 establishments in England